Romolo ed Ersilia is a three-act opera composed by Johann Adolph Hasse to an Italian-language libretto by Pietro Metastasio.  The opera was commissioned by Empress Maria Theresa to celebrate the marriage of her son Leopold to Maria Luisa of Spain. The opera was first performed on 6 August 1765, the day after their wedding, in the court theatre of the Imperial Palace in Innsbruck. The opera received its first performance in modern times in 2011 during the Innsbruck Festival of Early Music.

The opera is loosely based on The Rape of the Sabine Women, an episode in the legendary history of Rome, traditionally dated to 750 BC. The opera's main protagonists are Romolo (Romulus, the founder and ruler of Rome) and Ersilia (Hersilia, who became the wife of Romulus).

The same libretto was set eight years later by Josef Mysliveček and again titled Romolo ed Ersilia. The libretto also formed the basis for a 1780 ballet d'action choreographed by Charles Le Picq to music by Martín y Soler and entitled Il ratto delle Sabine. An opera entitled Romolo ed Ersilia is the opera seria which is parodied as the "opera within an opera" in Donizetti's Le convenienze ed inconvenienze teatrali.

Roles

Notes

References

External links
Libretto (published in Rome, 1765)
Manuscript score (on archive.org)

1765 operas
Operas by Johann Adolf Hasse
Italian-language operas
Operas set in fictional, mythological and folkloric settings
Operas